Edward Lee Miller (born June 29, 1957) is an American former professional baseball player. Listed at 5' 9", 175 lb., Miller was a switch hitter and threw left handed.

Career
Miller was born in San Pablo, California. He was selected by the Rangers in the second round of the 1975 MLB Draft out of Harry Ells High School in Richmond, California. His only major league home run came in his last career at bat.

Miller was traded along with Adrian Devine and Tommy Boggs from the Rangers to the Braves in the first four-team blockbuster deal in Major League Baseball history on December 8, 1977 that also involved the Pittsburgh Pirates, New York Mets and a total of eleven players changing teams. The Rangers received Al Oliver and Nelson Norman from the Pirates and Jon Matlack from the Mets. The Pirates acquired Bert Blyleven from the Rangers and John Milner from the Mets. The Mets got from the Braves Willie Montañez and from the Rangers Tom Grieve and Ken Henderson who was sent to New York to complete the transaction three months later on March 15, 1978.

Miller also played 14 minor league seasons between 1975 and 1990, including stints in the Mexican League and Venezuelan Winter Baseball.

References

External links
 
Retrosheet
Mexican League
Venezuelan Professional Baseball League

1957 births
Living people
African-American baseball players
American expatriate baseball players in Mexico
Asheville Tourists players
Atlanta Braves players
Baseball players from California
Beaumont Golden Gators players
Detroit Tigers players
Evansville Triplets players
Gulf Coast Rangers players
Leones del Caracas players
American expatriate baseball players in Venezuela
Major League Baseball outfielders
Mexican League baseball players
Portland Beavers players
Reno Padres players
Richmond Braves players
Rieleros de Aguascalientes players
San Diego Padres players
Sportspeople from Richmond, California
Sultanes de Monterrey players
Texas Rangers players
Tiburones de La Guaira players
Tulsa Drillers players
21st-century African-American people
20th-century African-American sportspeople